Giberville is a commune in the Calvados department in the Normandy region in northwestern France.

Population

International relations
Giberville is twinned with:
Murlo (Italy) since 2007.

See also
Communes of the Calvados department

References

External links

Official site

Communes of Calvados (department)
Calvados communes articles needing translation from French Wikipedia